Karagaysky District is an administrative district (raion) of Perm Krai, Russia; one of the thirty-three in the krai. As a municipal division, it is incorporated as Karagaysky Municipal District. It is located in the west of the krai. Its administrative center is the rural locality (a selo) of Karagay. Population:  The population of Karagay accounts for 29.2% of the district's total population.

Geography and climate
The relief is mostly hilly. Main river is the Obva, which flows through the district from west to east. District's forests are mostly coniferous, predominantly spruce and fir, and account for approximately 75% of the total forested area. Pine forests make up 4%; other forests are deciduous.

The climate of the district is temperate continental with long cold winters and warm but short summers.

History
The district was established on February 27, 1924 from Bogdanovskaya, Karagayskaya, Nikolskaya, and a part of Ust-Bubinskaya Volost of Okhansky Uyezd and from Kozmodemyanskaya, Obvinskaya, and a part of Sergiyevskaya Volost of Usolsky Uyezd of Perm Governorate. The district was abolished between January 1, 1932 and January 25, 1935 and then again between February 1, 1963 and January 12, 1965.

Demographics
Russians at 93% and the Komi-Permyak people at 2.8% are the predominant ethnic groups in the district.

Economy
The economy of the district is based on agriculture, which accounts for 60.6% of the district's GDP. The most significant industries are the production of building materials, as well as the light and food industries.

Notes

Sources

Districts of Perm Krai
States and territories established in 1924
States and territories disestablished in 1932
States and territories established in 1935
States and territories disestablished in 1963
States and territories established in 1965